Plaitford is a small village in the Test Valley district of Hampshire, England. Its nearest town is Romsey, which lies approximately 4.9 miles (7.8 km) east from the village; the large village of West Wellow is immediately west of Plaitford.

Plaitford manor was anciently within the county of Wiltshire. By 1885 it had become a civil parish, which was transferred to Hampshire in 1895. In 1932, the parishes of Plaitford and Melchet Park (north of Plaitford and also formerly in Wiltshire) were amalgamated to form the parish of Melchet Park and Plaitford.

The original village of Plaitford lies to the north of the River Blackwater, a tributary of the River Test, but the chief part of the population is now found further south near the A36 road, which crosses the parish from east to west. Plaitford Green is a small district in the north of the parish. Plaitford Common, which occupies the southern portion of the parish, consists chiefly of rough grassland and is owned by the National Trust.

References

External links

 Plaitford history at plaitford.org

Villages in Hampshire
Former civil parishes in Hampshire
Former civil parishes in Wiltshire